Galați is a city in Romania.

Galați may also refer one of the following locations in Romania:

 Galați County, the county containing that city
 Galați, a village in Zlatna Town, Alba County
 Galați, a village in Pui Commune, Hunedoara County
 Galați, a former village, now a district of Făgăraș City, Brașov County
 Galați, tributary of the river Ampoi in Alba County
 Galați, tributary of the river Olt in Brașov County
 Galații Bistriței, a commune in Bistrița-Năsăud County

Galați may also refer to:
 Ilarion Ionescu-Galați (born 1937), Romanian violinist

See also 
 Galati (disambiguation)